Aroland First Nation (2016 Population 366) is a Ojibwa, Oji-Cree and cree First Nation within the Nishnawbe Aski Nation Territory and a signatory to Treaty 9, located in the Thunder Bay District approximately 20 kilometres west of Nakina. Aroland First Nation, has Indian reserve status, though the settlement itself is not a reserve. The Aroland First Nation is also a member of the Matawa First Nations Tribal Council.

Located along the Canadian National Railway line, the community was originally named after the Arrow Land and Logging Company, which operated in the area from 1933 to 1941. Aroland First Nation's members are former members of the Long Lake 58 First Nation, Long Lac 77 First Nation (now Ginoogaming First Nation), Fort Hope First Nation (now Eabametoong First Nation), Marten Falls First Nation, and Fort William First Nation. In 1972, the settlement briefly was recorded as Aroland 83 Indian Reserve.

Aroland First Nation is policed by the Nishnawbe-Aski Police Service, an Aboriginal-based service.

Governance 
The current Chief is Dorothy Towedo, who is serving along with seven other Councillors: John Atlookan Sr., Sheldon Atlookan, Mark Bell, Krista Bouchard, Margaret Matasawagon, Lucien Mendowagon and Samson Meshake.

References

External links
 Aroland First Nation website
 Map of Aroland
 Aboriginal Affairs and Northern Development Canada profile

Nishnawbe Aski Nation
Ojibwe reserves in Ontario
Oji-Cree reserves in Ontario